The communauté de communes d’Auzances-Bellegarde  was created on December 27, 1995 and is located in the Creuse département of the Limousin  region of central France. It was created in January 1996. It was merged into the new Communauté de communes Marche et Combraille en Aquitaine in January 2017.

It comprised the following 26 communes:

Arfeuille-Châtain
Auzances
Bellegarde-en-Marche
Bosroger
Brousse
Bussière-Nouvelle
Champagnat
Chard
Charron
Châtelard
La Chaussade
Le Compas
Dontreix
Fontanières
Lioux-les-Monges
Lupersat
Mainsat
Les Mars
Mautes 
Reterre
Rougnat
Saint-Domet
Saint-Silvain-Bellegarde
Sannat
Sermur
La Serre-Bussière-Vieille

See also
Communes of the Creuse department

References 

Auzances-Bellegarde